John Vella (born April 21, 1950) is a former American football offensive tackle who played for the Oakland Raiders of the National Football League (NFL) between 1972 and 1979.

High school career
Vella prepped at Notre Dame High School in Sherman Oaks, California. The quarterback on this team was future MLB shortstop Tim Foli

College career
Vella played college football at the University of Southern California and was All-America in 1971, and was a member of the baseball team that won the 1970 College World Series.

Professional career
Joining the Oakland Raiders as a second round pick, Vella started his career as a backup on an offensive line that featured four future Hall of Famers, including tackles Art Shell and Bob Brown. A starter from 1974 to 1976, the 6–4, 265 lb. Vella was part of the Super Bowl XI championship team that dominated the Vikings. From 1977 to 1979, Vella was hampered by injuries, and lost his starting job to Henry Lawrence. His final year in the league, 1980, was spent with the Minnesota Vikings.  Vella 

In the documentary "America's Game: 1976 Oakland Raiders," Phil Villapiano refers to Vella as "Happy Fella John Vella," saying "Don't upset Happy Fella, 'cause he will tear your head off!"

Business career
In 1987, Vella started his business, originally called "John Vella's Raider Locker Room", with one store in Castro Valley, California.  At the time, the Raiders played in Los Angeles. The idea was for a retail store that sold only Raiders gear, novelties and collectibles, and catered to the die-hard fan that he remembered from his playing days.  He quickly realized he had found a niche, and when the Raiders returned to Oakland in 1995, his business boomed.

References

1950 births
Living people
American football offensive tackles
Minnesota Vikings players
Oakland Raiders players
People from Sherman Oaks, Los Angeles
Players of American football from Cleveland
Players of American football from Los Angeles
USC Trojans baseball players
USC Trojans football players